Downball (occasionally known as wallball) is a multiplayer game where players take turns hitting a tennis ball with their hands against a wall until a player misses a shot and is eliminated. The last player left is declared the winner and the next round begins. It is usually played by schoolchildren.

Downball walls were built in school yards. The game has been popular in Australian schools, especially in Melbourne and elsewhere around Victoria.

Downball is distinct from Australian handball, in which the ball must directly strike a wall first, rather than striking the ground first as in downball.  Downball is quite different from four-square (or the Australian schoolyard variant of four-square), which is played on a marked court on the ground, with a fixed number of players, with specific roles, without a wall.
 
Downball is usually played with a tennis ball. Two-6 number players can participate. The game area usually consists of a single wall, against which the players hit the ball. The ball must hit the ground once before hitting the wall. A player has the option to let the ball bounce once after hitting the wall or may choose to hit it straight away. The round begins with the champion serving the ball against the wall (one bounce on the ground then off the wall back into play). The other players hit the ball back at the wall in turn. The order of play stays the same throughout the match. Variants on the game demand no established order of play, but a requirement for the non-hitting person closest to the bounce to play the shot.

Players who fail to hit the ball back against the wall or hit the ball out of bounds go "out". When a player is "out" that player must vacate the field of play and not interfere with play until the next match (not round).

A match is made up of as many rounds needed to get all but one players out of the game. The survivor becomes the champion and serves during the next match. In the event that the ball is hit by every player to the end of the line of players the game will continue in a loop. In the event the champion goes out, the player second in line becomes the champion for the remainder of the match.

Downball often incorporates the addition of the "shark shot". This is played by hitting the ball on the full into another player's body with that player going out of the game. A player who misses a "Shark shot" also goes out of the game.

The "shark shot" inspired a dynamic schoolyard variant of the game, known in Melbourne as "Sharky" or "Sharkey", which is played with as many as 14 or 15 players. When playing Sharkey, there is no established order of play. Rather the closest person to the bounce is required to play the shot. Shots may be played at the wall or at another player (a "shark shot"). Players missing a shot, failing to dodge a sharkey shot hit at them, or missing another player when attempting a shark shot go "onto the wall", meaning that player must stand against the wall and continue to dodge shots played at the wall. If hit, a player "on the wall" goes out and takes no further part in the game.

A player on the wall may catch the ball after the ball is hit ("caught on the full"), after it bounces before contacting the wall, or after contacting the wall, but not after bouncing after contacting the wall. If a player on the wall catches the ball, he swaps placed with the player that hit the ball.

A full player (aka a player "in full life") who catches a shark shot stays in play and puts the person who played the shark shot "onto the wall".

The game is played until there is only one player left, who is awarded a "bag" (aka a "full bag"), which is a free life in the next game (meaning that if he is hit "on the wall", he may start again as a "full player"; or, if there are two "full players" towards the end of a game (and no one "one the wall"), they may, by mutual agreement, take a "half bag" each. A "half bag", when used, will allow a full player after being hit or missing a shot to stay in full play, off "the wall", or get a player hit when "on the wall" back onto "the wall".

Bags and half bags may be accrued across multiple games and remain with a player until next time he plays, but must be declared at the start of recess and/or lunchtime if deciding to play. 

This information is only relevant to some forms of downball

Downball Australia

See also 
 Wallball (variant of downball played in the USA)
 Australian handball

References 

Wall and ball games
Sports originating in Australia
Ball games